The Pikumche pericote (Loxodontomys pikumche) is a species of rodent in the family Cricetidae. It is known only from central Chile, where its range includes xeric shrublands (the matorral).

References

Mammals of Chile
Loxodontomys
Mammals described in 1998